Petra Danielle Beek (born 1 June 1973) is a Dutch former softball player. She played as a catcher for the Netherlands women's national softball team and HCAW.

She won with HCAW won the European Cup in 1994. She competed in the women's tournament at the 1996 Summer Olympics. She also competed in World Championships, including at the 1994 championships. 

Her sister Madelon Beek was also a member of the national team at the Olympics, and played also with her sister with HCAW.

Beek is in relationship with her previous national team member Marlies van der Putten. They live in Velserbroek and have a son and a daughter.

References

External links
 

1973 births
Living people
Dutch softball players
Olympic softball players of the Netherlands
Softball players at the 1996 Summer Olympics
People from Bussum
Sportspeople from North Holland